Lake Capital Partners is a private equity firm focused on growth capital and leveraged buyout investments in lower middle market companies across a range of service businesses.  It was founded in 1998 by Terence Graunke and Paul Yovovich.  Lake focuses on marketing, finance, operation and infrastructure, specialty services, healthcare, specialty consumer services, technology, and business process outsourcing.

In addition to traditional leveraged buyout transactions, Lake focuses on investing in rollup investments around a platform company.

The firm, which is based in Chicago, Illinois, was founded in 1998 by Terence Graunke and Paul Yovovich.  The firm has raised approximately $1.3 billion since inception across its two funds.  Prior to raising its 2002 debut fund with $500 million of commitments, Lake raised capital on a deal-by-deal basis.  In 2005, Lake raised its second fund, with $800 million of investor commitments.

References

Local firm recalculates private-equity formula; Lake Capital's first fund selling out.  Crain's Chicago Business, October 28, 2002 
Addison Receives Strategic Investment from Lake Capital.  Jun 13, 2006 
Chicago Private Equity Firm Takes Plunge with Second Consulting Firm Stake. Chicago Tribune, October 3, 2003

External links
Lake Capital Partners (company website)

Private equity firms of the United States
Companies based in Chicago
Financial services companies established in 1998